= Gemeente =

Gemeente (Dutch for municipality) may refer to:

- Municipalities of the Netherlands
- Municipalities of Belgium
- A Church Community of South Arica Afrikaans
